Child labor existed in the Netherlands up to and through the Industrial Revolution (1760-1830)  Laws governing child labor in factories were first passed in 1874, but child labor on farms continued to be the norm up until the 20th century.

History
As everywhere, child labor in the Netherlands was driven by financial necessity. Children in rural areas have always been expected to help with chores around the home and farm, oftentimes (especially during harvests) foregoing schooling to work at home. This allowed poor rural families to extend their farming activities without having to hire on extra help.

As the Industrial Revolution came, families moved to the cities for factory work, and lacking childcare, brought their children with them, who were then also put to work. Children provided cheap, agile and fast-learning labor, often able to accomplish manual tasks impossible to adults due to the size of their hands. Factory owners preferred children for their greater docility and willingness to work for lower wages than adults. Because of their greater agility, children were often used for the most dangerous machine maintenance tasks, leading to high death rates among laboring children.

By 1860, more than 500,000 children (of a then population of three million people) between the ages of 6 and 11 were employed in Netherlands' factories. There appeared to be little opposition to this situation; the government actually encouraged the practice to keep the price of manufactured goods low.  Children were employed in various industries, especially textiles, peat excavation, commercial bakeries, and tobacco products production.  Typical wages in 1860 were 25 cents/day for girls and 35 cents/day for boys.

The beginnings of change
Beginning in the second half of the nineteenth century, sentiment began to rise against child labor.  Realizing that child labor hampered children's education and was detrimental to their health, and that child labor was reducing the opportunities for adult laborers, the Dutch began to react.  Newspaper articles and books were published speaking out against the practice, leading to the first child labor law in 1874.  Samuel van Houten introduced the Kinderwetje -- van Houten (the Child Labor Act) that forbade children younger than 12 from working in factories.  The law stipulated penalties for infractions, but did not authorize any agency to enforce the law.  It also included many exceptions, such as farm work and home work.  Because of its exceptions and lack of enforcement, the law had little effect on the overall child labor situation.  It wasn't until 1882 that the government instituted as system of factory inspections to enforce the child labor laws.  From 1882 until 1887, the penalties for illegal child labor were limited to fines levied against the factories, but in 1887, penalties became stricter, which led to an overall decline in child factory labor.

In 1900, the Netherlands passed a law requiring all children to attend school until age 12.  Truancy officers were empowered to verify school attendance, and recalcitrant parents were handled with increasingly severe consequences.  After age 12, children were free to remain home or enter the work force.  There was also at this time the advent of post-compulsory education, providing technical or professional training.

Present day
Currently, children in the Netherlands are required to attend school until the age of 18, or until they receive their secondary (high school) diploma.

References

External links
Cultuurwijs.nl
Entoen.nu
Schooltv.nl
Hetklokhuis.nl

Netherlands
Society of the Netherlands
Labour